This is the list of äkims of Aqmola Region that have held the position since 1992.

List 

 Andrey Braun (12 February 1992 – 3 July 1997)
 Jänıbek Kärıbjanov (3 July 1997 – 18 December 1997)
 Vladimir Gartman (19 December 1997 – 14 September 1998)
 Sergey Kulagin (16 September 1998 – 20 March 2004)
 Mäjit Esenbaev (20 March 2004 – 23 January 2008)
 Albert Rau (23 January 2008 – 13 March 2010)
 Sergey Dyachenko (13 March 2010 – 20 January 2012)
 Qairat Qojamjarov (21 January 2012 – 21 January 2013)
 Kosman Aitmūhametov (22 January 2013 – 27 May 2014)
 Sergey Kulagin (27 May 2014 – 14 March 2017)
 Mälık Myrzalin (14 March 2017 – 19 March 2019)
 Ermek Marjyqpaev (19 March 2019 – present)

References

See also 

 Akim

 Akmola Region

Akmola Region